Charles Pinckney may refer to:

 Charles Pinckney (South Carolina chief justice) (died 1758), father of Charles Cotesworth Pinckney
 Colonel Charles Pinckney (1731–1782), South Carolina politician, loyal to British during Revolutionary War, father of Charles Pinckney, the governor
 Charles Pinckney (governor) (1757–1824), South Carolina governor, drafter of U.S. Constitution, second cousin of Charles Cotesworth Pinckney
 Charles Cotesworth Pinckney (1746–1825), U.S. vice presidential candidate (1800), U.S. presidential candidate (1804 and 1808)